A round steak is a beef steak from the "round", the rear leg of the cow. The round is divided into cuts including the eye (of) round, bottom round, and top round, with or without the "round" bone (femur), and may include the knuckle (sirloin tip), depending on how the round is separated from the loin. This is a lean cut and it is moderately tough. Lack of fat and marbling makes round dry out when cooked with dry-heat cooking methods like roasting or grilling. Round steak is commonly prepared with slow moist-heat methods including braising, to tenderize the meat and maintain moisture. The cut is often sliced thin, then dried or smoked at low temperature to make jerky.

Rump cover, with its thick layer of accompanying fat, is considered one of the best (and most flavorful) beef cuts in many South American countries, particularly Brazil and Argentina. This specific cut does not tend to be found elsewhere, however.

Topside and silverside
British cuts topside and silverside together are roughly equivalent to the American round cut. New Zealand cuts also use these terms (or sometimes "outside round" for silverside).

Dishes
 Biltong — air-dried beef cured with vinegar, salt, and coriander; made preferentially with round steak
 Bresaola — air-dried salted beef made with round steak
 London broil — bias-cut roasted steak, commonly made with round steak
 Italian beef — thinly sliced round steak cooked in stock
 Rinderbraten — round steak stuffed with pork fat and spices
 Steak and Guinness pie — round steak with Guinness stout, bacon, and onions, in pie crust
 Tafelspitz — Austrian dish of boiled veal, prepared from the top part of the round
 Jangjorim — Korean dish of eye of round boiled down in soy sauce, commonly with braised quail eggs (mechurial jangjorim) or shishito pepper (kkwarigochu jangjorim)

Common preparations
 Ground round or beef mince — a type of ground beef made from round steak and trimmings from the primal round; this is also the name of a U.S. restaurant chain, Ground Round
 Accordion cut — cutting on alternating sides and stretching to make a thinner overall steak
 Butterflying — cutting through the center, leaving a small hinge of meat, and unfolding to create a thinner steak
 Swiss steak — preparing by making a series of small cuts with a bladed roller or pounding flat, also called Swissing, cubing or tenderizing

See also

 List of steak dishes
 Popeseye steak

References

External links
 

Cuts of beef